Beatrix of Nuremberg (Nuremberg – 10 June 1414, Perchtoldsdorf) was a daughter of Frederick V, Burgrave of Nuremberg and his wife Elisabeth of Meissen.

In 1375 in Vienna, she married Duke Albert III of Austria.  They had one son: Albert IV.

Ancestry

House of Hohenzollern
1360s births
1414 deaths
14th-century German nobility
15th-century German nobility
14th-century German women
15th-century German women
Daughters of monarchs